Carl-Göran "Lill-Stöveln" Öberg (born 24 December 1938) is a retired ice hockey player who won silver medals at the 1964 Winter Olympics and 1963 and 1967 world championships. He was nicknamed Lill-Stöveln (Little Stöveln) after his elder brother, the Olympic ice hockey player Hans "Stöveln" Öberg.

Öberg won the national title in 1957 with Gävle Godtemplares IK and in 1961–63 with Djurgårdens IF. In 1963 he was selected to the Swedish all-star team.

During a game versus Canada in ice hockey at the 1964 Winter Olympics, Öberg broke his stick and tossed it aside. The broken end of the stick went towards the Canadian players' bench, where it struck their coach Father David Bauer in the face and opened a bleeding wound. Bauer demanded for his players to remain on the bench and not retaliate. Bauer forgave Öberg and extended an invitation to sit together at the game between the Soviet Union and Czechoslovakia.

Öberg played bandy with Djurgårdens IF Bandy 1961–62.

References

External links
 

1938 births
Djurgårdens IF Hockey players
Ice hockey players at the 1960 Winter Olympics
Ice hockey players at the 1964 Winter Olympics
Ice hockey players at the 1968 Winter Olympics
Living people
Medalists at the 1964 Winter Olympics
Olympic medalists in ice hockey
Olympic silver medalists for Sweden
People from Gävle Municipality
Södertälje SK players
Sportspeople from Gävleborg County
Swedish ice hockey left wingers
Swedish bandy players
Djurgårdens IF Bandy players